Željko Perović (Cyrillic: Жељко Перовић; born 11 August 1975) is a Montenegrin retired football midfielder.

Club career
Born in Nikšić, SR Montenegro, still within Yugoslavia, Perović played with FK Sutjeska Nikšić before joining Red Star Belgrade in summer 1998. He made 4 appearances with Red Star in the First League of FR Yugoslavia. Besides Red Star, he played for several other clubs in Yugoslavia, namely Serbian sides FK Rad and FK Mladost Apatin, and Montenegrin FK Sutjeska Nikšić and FK Mogren. Between 2003 and 2006 he played abroad in Poland with Zagłębie Lubin. He made 14 appearances with Zagłębie in the 2003–04 I liga, and then, after promotion, 3 appearances in the 2004–05 Ekstraklasa. Then he played with Mogren in the 2006–07 Montenegrin First League.

Honors
Red Star
First League of FR Yugoslavia: 2000–01
FR Yugoslavia Cup: 1999

References

1975 births
Living people
Footballers from Nikšić
Association football midfielders
Serbia and Montenegro footballers
Montenegrin footballers
FK Sutjeska Nikšić players
Red Star Belgrade footballers
FK Rad players
FK Mladost Apatin players
FK Mogren players
Zagłębie Lubin players
Second League of Serbia and Montenegro players
First League of Serbia and Montenegro players
Ekstraklasa players
Montenegrin First League players
Serbia and Montenegro expatriate footballers
Expatriate footballers in Poland
Serbia and Montenegro expatriate sportspeople in Poland